Hilpoltstein station is a railway station in the municipality of Hilpoltstein, located in the Roth district in Middle Franconia, Germany.

References

Railway stations in Bavaria
Buildings and structures in Roth (district)